Tsigie Gebreselama (born 30 September 2000) is an Ethiopian long-distance runner. She won the silver medal in the women's race at the 2023 World Cross Country Championships and bronze for the junior women's race at the 2019 World Cross Country Championships. In 2019, she also won the 15 km road race at the Istanbul Marathon.

Career
At the 2018 World Under-20 Championships, 17-year-old Tsigie Gebreselama won the bronze medal in the women's 3000 metres event.

In 2019, she won the bronze medal in the junior women's race at the World Cross Country Championships with a time of 20:50. In the same year, she also won the 15 km Montferland Run held in 's-Heerenberg, Netherlands, setting a new course record of 47:29.

The 20-year-old competed in the women's 10,000 metres event at the postponed 2020 Tokyo Olympics in 2021.

She won the silver medal for the women's race at the 2023 World Cross Country Championships held in Bathurst, Australia.

Achievements

International competitions

National titles
 Ethiopian Athletics Championships
 10,000 metres: 2021

References

External links
 

Living people
Place of birth missing (living people)
Ethiopian female long-distance runners
Ethiopian female cross country runners
Athletes (track and field) at the 2020 Summer Olympics
Olympic athletes of Ethiopia
Olympic female marathon runners
2000 births
21st-century Ethiopian women